Kanakagiri Jain tirth kshetra also known as Kanakadri and Hemantha Desha is situated at about 3 km from Maleyuru, Chamarajanagar district, 53 km from the Mysore city and 182 km from Bengaluru.

History
It is one of the important Jain pilgrim centres of Karnataka known in ancient times as Hemanga Desha. It is believed that Jain saint Achrya Pujyapada established a monastery here in 5th century. The scriptures in Kanakagiri mentions that Mahavira visited this area and held a Samavasharan Divya Sabha (a meeting). Kanakgiri houses stone inscriptions dating to period of Western Ganga, Hoysala, Vijayanagara and Maharaja of Mysore.

The Parshvanatha temple was built by the kings of the Western Ganga dynasty in the 5th or 6th century. Kings of later dynasties such as the Hoysala, Vijayanagara and Wadiyar also patronised this temple. It is believed that one king worshipped Bhagwan Parshwanatha here before proceeding to a war in which he was victorious and hence he named the deity, Vijaya Parshwanatha.

According to inscription dated 909 CE, the temple was an important Jain center and mentions temple receiving grants under the leadership of Bhattaraka Kanakasena. A inscription dating back to 916 CE refers to construction of a Jain temple by Western Ganga King Nitimarga. During the reign of Hoysalas, more Jain images both rock cut and structural were added.

About Temple
The main temple on the 350 steps hillock is enclosed in a fort, has four main parts, namely, the mukhamantapa, the navaranga, the sukhanasi and the garbhagriha. This temple enshrines idols of five main deities together – Parshwanatha, Padmavati, Jwalamalini, Kushmandini, and Kshetrapala Bramha Yaksha. The garbhagriha houses Bhagwan Parshwanatha while the sukhanasi houses the rest. There are 3 temples and tonks of 24 tirthankar. This temple also includes an 18-feet monolithic idol of Bahubali.

Kanakagiri is the only Jain temple where Kalasarpadosha parihara puja is performed. According to legends, Queen Deverammanni of Mysore royal family once suffered from kalasarpadosha and found relief on worshiping the Goddesses here. So, she gave the temple a unique idol of the hood of snake bearing Dharanendra and Padmavathi figures. The idol is currently placed in the sukhanasi.

There are 24 charan (foot prints) of the 24 Tirthankaras near the temple complex. There are caves on the hill where Jain saints once meditated. There is a Jain Mutt at the foot of the hill under the patronage of Swasthi Shree Bhuvanakeerthi Bhattaraka Swamiji.

Athishaya Mahotsava 2017 
The Jain committee had organised the Athishaya Mahothsava at Kanakagiri from January 16 to 5 February 2017. The first Mahamastakabhisheka and Sarvadharma Samavesha of 18-feet statue of Bahubali was performed on Feb, 2017.

Gallery

Nearby places
There are many Jain temples nearby. Mainly temples are:
 Adinatha Swamy Basadi, Maleyuru
 Adinatha Basadi at Harave, Hunsur.

See also 

 Jainism in Karnataka
 List of Jain temples

Citations

Sources

External links 
 

5th-century Jain temples
Cities and towns in Chamarajanagar district
Holy cities
Jain pilgrimage sites
Jain rock-cut architecture
Jain temples in Karnataka
Tourism in Karnataka